Stephenson is an unincorporated community in Frederick County, Virginia. Stephenson is located on U.S. Route 11 north of Winchester.

High Banks, a historic home and farm dating from the mid-18th century, was listed on the National Register of Historic Places in 2011.

References

Unincorporated communities in Frederick County, Virginia
Unincorporated communities in Virginia